Davis Township is an inactive township in Lafayette County, in the U.S. state of Missouri.

Davis Township was established in 1830, and most likely was named after Davis Creek.

References

Townships in Missouri
Townships in Lafayette County, Missouri